Dublin postal districts have been used by Ireland's postal service, known as An Post, to sort mail in Dublin. The system is similar to that used in cities in Europe and North America until they adopted national postal code systems in the 1960s and 1970s. These were incorporated into a new national postcode system, known as Eircode, which was implemented in 2015. Under the Eircode system, the city is covered by the original routing areas D01 to D24, along with A## and K## codes for locations elsewhere in County Dublin.

History

The postal district system was introduced in 1917 by the British government, as a practical way to organise local postal distribution. This followed the example of other cities, including London, first subdivided into ten districts in 1857, and Liverpool, the first city in Britain or Ireland to have postcodes, from 1864. The letter "D" was assigned to designate Dublin. The new Irish government retained the postal district system, but district numbers were not used by the public until 1961, when they were added to street signs. Prior to 1961, street signs only displayed the street name in Irish and English.

The number of districts was increased as the city grew, and in the 1970s, large districts were subdivided. Dublin 5 was split, with the coastal part retaining the "5" and the inland part becoming Dublin 17. Dublin 8, Ballyfermot became Dublin 10, along with Palmerstown and Chapelizod. However, Dublin 10 was subsequently split again, with Palmerstown and Chapelizod forming Dublin 20.

In 1985, Dublin 6 was divided, with some areas, such as Templeogue, Kimmage and Terenure becoming part of a new district in order to facilitate processing of mail by a new delivery office for those areas. Residents of some areas objected to the assignation of the next available number, "Dublin 26," for the new postal district, citing property devaluation: the higher numbered districts typically represented less affluent and less central areas. An Post ultimately relented, and the western part of the district became known as Dublin 6W.

Structure

Historically, the postal district appeared with one or two digits (or in the case of one district, a digit and a letter) at the end of addresses:

Sample Address, Sample Street, Dublin 8

Under the Eircode postcode system, the postal district number is still retained in Dublin addresses, even though this information is also contained in the "Locator code" portion of the Eircode postcodes, e.g.:

Sample Address, Sample Street, Dublin 8, D08 1X2Y

In most cases, odd numbers are used for addresses on the Northside of the River Liffey, while even numbers are on addresses on the Southside. Exceptions to this are the Phoenix Park (along with a small area between the Park and the River Liffey), and Chapelizod Village which, although on the Northside, are parts of the Dublin 8 and Dublin 20 postal districts respectively.

The numbering system is not used for some areas in County Dublin, such as Dún Laoghaire, Blackrock, Lucan or Swords, though it is used for other county locations, for example Firhouse, Foxrock, Kilshane, Knocklyon and Tallaght.

Dublin 1 (D1) 

Dublin 1 includes most of the city centre north of the River Liffey, including Abbey Street, Amiens Street, Capel Street, Dorset Street, Henry Street and Mary Street, Mountjoy Square, Marlborough Street, North Wall, O'Connell Street, Parnell Square, and Talbot Street. This area include the General Post Office, from which distances are measured.

Dublin 2 (D2) 

Dublin 2 encompasses most of the city centre south of the River Liffey and takes in areas around Merrion Square, Trinity College, Temple Bar, Grafton Street, St Stephen's Green, Dame Street, and Leeson Street. Dublin 2 also covers the Grand Canal Dock and the City Quay areas. Dublin 2 is the location of a number of government departments and addresses such as Leinster House, Government Buildings, and the Mansion House. The borders of Dublin 2 are the Liffey in the north, the Grand Canal to the south and east and Aungier, Wexford and Camden Streets to the west.

Dublin 3 (D3) 
Dublin 3 encompasses areas such as Ballybough, North Strand, Clonliffe, Clontarf, Dollymount, East Wall (including East Point), Fairview, most of Killester, and Marino.

Dublin 4 (D4) 

Dublin 4 includes Ballsbridge, Belfield, Donnybrook, Irishtown, Merrion, Pembroke, Ringsend and Sandymount and contains the RDS grounds, Aviva Stadium (formerly Lansdowne Road stadium), and many embassies. Long considered the city's wealthiest postcode, "Dublin 4" has acquired its own socio-economic identity.

Dublin 5 (D5) 
Dublin 5 includes most of Artane, central Coolock, Harmonstown, Kilbarrack, Killester, and Raheny.

Dublin 6 (D6) 
Dublin 6 includes Milltown, Ranelagh, parts of Terenure, Rathmines (including Dartry), and Rathgar.

Dublin 6 West (D6W) 

Dublin 6 West includes Harold's Cross, Templeogue, Kimmage and Terenure.

Dublin 7 (D7) 
Dublin 7 includes Arbour Hill, some parts of Ashtown, Broadstone, Cabra, Grangegorman, Oxmantown, Phibsborough, Smithfield, Stoneybatter.

Dublin 8 (D8) 

Dublin 8 includes Dolphin's Barn, Inchicore, Islandbridge, Kilmainham, Merchants Quay, Portobello, South Circular Road, the Phoenix Park and the Liberties. Notable buildings include Christ Church Cathedral and St. Patrick's Cathedral. It is one of only two postal districts to span the Liffey.

Dublin 9 (D9) 
Dublin 9 includes parts of Ballymun east of Ballymun Road (Shangan and Coultry), Beaumont, Donnycarney, Drumcondra, Elm Mount, Griffith Avenue, parts of Glasnevin (St Mobhi, Botanic Gardens and Met Éireann), Santry, and Whitehall.

Dublin 10 (D10) 
Dublin 10 includes Ballyfermot, Sarsfield Road, and Cherry Orchard.

Dublin 11 (D11) 
Dublin 11 includes most of Ballymun west of Ballymun Road (Sillogue, Balcurris, Balbutcher, Poppintree, Sandyhill and Wadelai), Dubber Cross, Finglas (including Ballygall and Cappagh), most of Glasnevin (Cremore, Addison, Violet Hill, Finglas Road, Old Finglas Road and Glasnevin Cemetery), Kilshane Cross, The Ward and Coolquay.

Dublin 12 (D12) 
Dublin 12 includes Bluebell, Crumlin, parts of Kimmage, Drimnagh, Greenhills, Perrystown and Walkinstown.

Dublin 13 (D13) 
Dublin 13 includes Baldoyle, Bayside, Donaghmede, Clongriffin, Sutton, Howth and Ayrfield.

Dublin 14 (D14) 
Dublin 14 includes Churchtown, Clonskeagh, most of Dundrum, Goatstown, lower Rathfarnham and Windy Arbour.

Dublin 15 (D15) 

Dublin 15 includes Ashtown, Blanchardstown, Castleknock, Coolmine, Clonsilla, Corduff, Mulhuddart, Tyrrelstown, and Ongar. While the town of Clonee is located in Dublin's neighbouring County Meath, for mailing purposes it is designated as D15. This leads to a mailing quirk whereby the town's addresses could be verbalised as ending with, "County Meath, Dublin 15".

Dublin 16 (D16) 
Dublin 16 includes Ballinteer, Ballyboden, parts of Dundrum, Kilmashogue, Knocklyon, upper Rathfarnham and Rockbrook.

Dublin 17 (D17) 
Dublin 17 includes Balgriffin, most of Coolock, and Belcamp, Darndale and Priorswood.

Dublin 18 (D18) 
Dublin 18 includes Cabinteely, Carrickmines, Foxrock, Kilternan, Sandyford, Shankill, Ticknock, Ballyedmonduff, Stepaside, and Leopardstown.

Dublin 20 (D20) 
Dublin 20 includes Chapelizod, and Palmerstown. This is one of only two postal districts to span the Liffey.

Dublin 22 (D22) 
Dublin 22 includes Clondalkin, Liffey Valley, Newcastle and Neilstown.

Dublin 24 (D24) 
Dublin 24 includes Firhouse, Jobstown, Old Bawn, Tallaght, and parts of Ballymount.

County Dublin (A41 – K78) 
These areas do not fall inside the historic Dublin postal districts and their postal routing keys came about through the new Eircode system. This is because many of these suburbs and towns fell outside the purview of Dublin city in the past. Today, they form part of "A" and "K" Dublin Eircode areas. There are 12 of these districts in total. Notable locales include Blackrock, Dún Laoghaire, Malahide, Swords, Lucan, Rush and Skerries. While a small part of Bray lies in Dún Laoghaire–Rathdown, for mailing purposes, the entirety of Bray is in County Wicklow's A98 routing area.

Later developments

Successive Ministers for Communications since 2005 announced plans to introduce a full postcode system across the state.

On 8 October 2013, Minister for Communications, Energy and Natural Resources, Pat Rabbitte announced a postcode system for the entire country. This came into effect during 2015 and gave an individual post code to every address in Ireland. The pre-existing Dublin district numbers are a component of the full postcode for relevant addresses, forming part of the routing code, the first three characters of the code. For example, a code for an address in Dublin 1 would start with D01, followed by four characters, hence Dublin D01 B2CD.

Marketing
The districts are sometimes used in a manner similar to the sub-districts of the London postal district whereby they replace a placename. A property might be described as being "in D4", for example. This public awareness of Dublin postal districts allows occasional use in marketing. Dublin n is usually abbreviated to Dn, with examples including the "D7 Restaurant", "Dtwo" nightclub, or "D4 Hotels".

See also
 Republic of Ireland postal addresses
List of Eircode routing areas in Ireland
 List of postal codes

References

External links
 Eircode (official website)
 An Post — The Post Office
 ComReg — Commission for Communications Regulation

 
Dublin (city)-related lists
County Dublin-related lists